Nidal Yehya is a Lebanese diplomat currently serving as Lebanon's ambassador to Japan. He was previously the ambassador for Lebanon in Senegal and Australia, Consul of the embassies in Iran and Venezuela, the Consul General of the embassy in Egypt, and the Deputy Minister of the embassy in Serbia.

Biography 
Yehya served as the ambassador to Japan in December, 2017.

In 2019, he was accused of helping former Nissan chief executive Carlos Ghosn escape Japan and travel to Lebanon. Yehya denied any involvement of the embassy in the escape of Ghosn.

References 

Lebanese diplomats
Living people
Ambassadors of Lebanon to Australia
Ambassadors of Lebanon to Japan
Ambassadors of Lebanon to Senegal
Year of birth missing (living people)